Sefirot, meaning emanations, are the 10 attributes/emanations in Kabbalah, through which Ein Sof (The Infinite) reveals itself and continuously creates both the physical realm and the chain of higher metaphysical realms (Seder hishtalshelus). The term is alternatively transliterated into English as sephirot/sephiroth, singular sefirah/sephirah, etc.

Alternative configurations of the sefirot are interpreted by various schools in the historical evolution of Kabbalah, with each articulating differing spiritual aspects. The tradition of enumerating 10 is stated in the Sefer Yetzirah, "Ten sefirot of nothingness, ten and not nine, ten and not eleven". As altogether 11 sefirot are listed across the various schemes, two (Keter and Da'at) are seen as unconscious and conscious manifestations of the same principle, conserving the 10 categories. The sefirot are described as channels of divine creative life force or consciousness through which the unknowable divine essence is revealed to mankind. 

The first sefirah, Keter, describes the divine superconscious Will that is beyond conscious intellect. The next three sefirot (Chokhmah, Binah and Da'at) describe three levels of conscious divine intellect. In particular, Da'at represents Keter in its knowable form, the concept of knowledge. Will and knowledge are corresponding somewhat dependent opposites. The seven subsequent sefirot (Chesed, Gevurah, Tiferet, Netzach, Hod, Yesod and Malkuth) describe the primary and secondary conscious divine emotions. The sefirot of the left side and the sefira of Malkuth are feminine, as the female principle in Kabbalah describes a vessel that receives the outward male light, then inwardly nurtures and gives birth to the sefirot below them. Kabbalah sees the human soul as mirroring the divine (after Genesis 1:27, "God created man in His own image, in the image of God He created him, male and female He created them"), and more widely, all creations as reflections of their life source in the sefirot. Therefore, the sefirot also describe the spiritual life of man, break down man's psychological processes, and constitute the conceptual paradigm in Kabbalah for understanding everything. This relationship between the soul of man and the divine gives Kabbalah one of its two central metaphors in describing divinity, alongside the other Ohr (light) metaphor. However, Kabbalah repeatedly stresses the need to avoid all corporeal interpretation. Through this, the sefirot are related to the structure of the body and are reformed into partzufim (personas). Underlying the structural purpose of each sefirah is a hidden motivational force which is understood best by comparison with a corresponding psychological state in human spiritual experience.

In Hasidic philosophy, which has sought to internalise the experience of Jewish mysticism into daily inspiration (devekut), this inner life of the sefirot is explored, and the role they play in man's service of God in this world.

Ein Sof 
The Ein Sof (lit: without end) is an important concept in Jewish Kabbalah. Generally translated as "infinity" and "endless", the Ein Sof represents the formless state of the universe before the self-materialization of God. In other words, the Ein Sof is God before he decided to become God as we now know him.

The sefirot are divine emanations that come from the Ein Sof in a manner often described as a flame. The sefirot emanate from above to below. As the first Sefira is closest to Ein Sof, it is the least comprehensible to the human mind, while in turn the last is the best understood because it is closest to the material world that humanity dwells on.

Ten sefirot

Sefirot (sfirot, singular  sfira), literally means "counting, enumeration", but early Kabbalists presented a number of other etymological possibilities from the same Hebrew root including: sefer ("text" - ספר), sippur ("recounting a story" - סיפור), sappir ("sapphire" - ספיר, "brilliance", "luminary"), sfar ("boundary" - ספר), and sofer, or safra ("scribe" - ספרא, סופר). The term sefirah thus has complex connotations within Kabbalah.

The original reference to the sefirot is found in the ancient Kabbalistic text of Sefer Yetzirah, "The Book of Formation", attributed to the first Jewish patriarch, Abraham. However, the names of the sefirot as given in later Kabbalah are not specified there, but rather are only identified by their attributes "forward", "backward", "right", "left", "down", "up", "light", "darkness", "good" and "evil". Further references to the sefirot, now with their later-accepted names, are elaborated on in the medieval Kabbalistic text of the Zohar, which is one of the core texts of Kabbalah.

The sefirot are 10 emanations, or illuminations of God's infinite light as it manifests in creation. As revelations of the creator's will ( rɔṣon), the sefirot should not be understood as 10 different "gods", but rather as 10 different channels through which the one God reveals His will. In later Jewish literature, the 10 sefirot refer either to the 10 manifestations of God; the 10 powers or faculties of the soul; or the 10 structural forces of nature.

In Cordoveran Kabbalah, the forces of creation are considered as autonomous forces that evolve independently of one another. By contrast, in Lurean or Lurianic Kabbalah (the Kabbalah of Isaac Luria), the sefirot are perceived as a constellation of forces in active dialogue with one another at every stage of that evolution. Luria described the sefirot as complex and dynamically interacting entities known as partzufim, or faces, each with its own symbolically human-like persona.

Keter, the Crown, is the first sefirah. It is the superconscious intermediary between God and the other, conscious sefirot. Three different levels, or "heads", are identified within Keter. In some contexts, the highest level of Keter is called "The unknowable head", The second level is "the head of nothingness" (reisha d'ayin) and the third level is "the long head" (reisha d'arich). These three heads correspond to the superconscious levels of faith, pleasure and will in the soul.

In its early 12th-century dissemination, Kabbalah garnered criticism from some rabbis who adhered to Jewish philosophy, for its alleged introduction of multiplicity into Jewish monotheism. The seeming plurality of the One God is a result of the spiritual evolution of God's light, which introduced a multiplicity of emanations from the one infinite divine essence. This was necessary due to the inability of mankind to exist in God's infinite presence. God does not change; rather, it is our ability to perceive his emanations that is modified. This is stressed in Kabbalah to avoid heretical notions of any plurality in the Godhead. One parable to explain this is the difference between the Ma'Ohr ("Luminary"-divine essence) and the Ohr ("Light") he emanates, like the difference between the single body of the sun and the multiple rays of sunlight that illuminate a room.

Names in Cordoveran Kabbalah
In Kabbalah, there is a direct correspondence between the Hebrew name of any spiritual or physical phenomenon and its manifestations in the mundane world. The Hebrew name represents the unique essence of the object. This reflects the belief that the universe is created through the metaphorical speech of God, as stated in the first chapter of Genesis. Kabbalah expounds on the names of the sefirot and their nuances, including their gematria (numerical values), in order to reach an understanding of these emanations of God's essence.

In the 16th-century rational synthesis of Moses ben Jacob Cordovero (Cordoveran Kabbalah), the first complete systemisation of Kabbalah, the sefirot are listed from highest to lowest:

Man-metaphor in Kabbalah

Kabbalah uses subtle anthropomorphic analogies and metaphors to describe God in Judaism, both the God-world relationship, and the inner nature of the divine. These include the metaphor of the soul-body relationship, the functions of human soul-powers, the configuration of human bodily form, and female-male influences in the divine. Kabbalists repeatedly warn and stress the need to divorce their notions from any corporality, dualism, plurality, or spatial and temporal connotations. As "the Torah speaks in the language of Man", the empirical terms are necessarily imposed upon human experience in this world. Once the analogy is described, its limitations are then related to stripping the kernel of its husk to arrive at a truer conception. Nonetheless, Kabbalists carefully chose their terminology to denote subtle connotations and profound relationships in the divine spiritual influences. More accurately, as they see the emanation of the material world from the spiritual realms, the analogous anthropomorphisms and material metaphors themselves derive through cause and effect from their precise root analogies on High.

Describing the material world below in general, and humans in particular, as created in the "image" of the world above is not restricted in Rabbinic Judaism to Kabbalah, but abounds more widely in Biblical, Midrashic, Talmudic and philosophical literature. Kabbalah extends the Man-metaphor more radically to anthropomorphise particular divine manifestations on high, while repeatedly stressing the need to divest analogies from impure materialistic corporality. Classical proof texts on which it bases its approach include, "From my flesh I envisage God", and the rabbinic analogy "As the soul permeates the whole body...sees but is not seen...sustains the whole body...is pure...abides in the innermost precincts...is unique in the body...does not eat and drink...no man knows where its place is...so the Holy One, Blessed is He..." Together with the metaphor of light, the Man-metaphor is central in Kabbalah. Nonetheless, it too has its limitations, needs qualification, and breaks down if taken as a literal, corporeal comparison. Its limitations include the effect of the body on the soul, while the World effects no change in God; and the distinct, separate origins of the soul and the body, while in relation to God's omnipresence, especially in its acosmic Hasidic development, all creation is nullified in its source.

Configuration of the body

Despite the particular geometric depiction of the Yosher scheme, through each soul faculty in the body, physical human organs also reflect the supernal divine forces on high, as the scheme of Yosher underscores the inter-relationship of the sefirot as a unit or body. In this context, the physical upright standing of humans contrasts with the horizontal forms of animals. The correspondence of the sefirot with the physical organs of a human:

Inner dimensions and the powers of the soul

As all levels of Creation are constructed around the 10 sefirot, their names in Kabbalah describe the particular role each plays in forming reality. These are the external dimensions of the sefirot, describing their functional roles in channelling the divine, creative Ohr (Light) to all levels. As the sefirot are viewed to comprise both metaphorical "lights" and "vessels", their structural role describes the particular identity each sefirah possesses from its characteristic vessel. Underlying this functional structure of the sefirot, each one possesses a hidden, inner spiritual motivation that inspires its activity. This forms the particular characteristic of inner light within each sefirah.

Understanding the sefirot throughout Jewish mysticism is achieved by their correspondence to the human soul. This applies to the outer, Kabbalistic structure of the sefirot. It applies even more to their inner dimensions, which correspond to inner psychological qualities in human perception. Identifying the essential spiritual properties of the soul gives the best insight into their divine source, and in the process reveals the spiritual beauty of the soul. In Hasidic thought these inner dimensions of the sefirot are called the Powers of the Soul. Hasidism sought the internalisation of the abstract ideas of Kabbalah, both outwardly in joyful sincerity of dveikus in daily life, acts of loving-kindness and prayer; and inwardly in its profound new articulation of Jewish mystical thought, by relating it to the inner life of man. Articulation of the sefirot in Hasidic philosophy is primarily concerned with their inner dimensions, and exploring the direct, enlivening contribution of each in man's spiritual worship of God. Kabbalah focuses on the esoteric manifestations of God in creation, the vessels of divinity. Hasidut looks at the lights that fill these vessels, how the structures reveal the divine essence, and how this inwardness can be perceived. This difference can be seen in the names of these two stages of Jewish mysticism. "Kabbalah" in Hebrew is derived from "kabal" (to "receive" as a vessel). "Hasidut" is from "chesed" ("loving-kindness"), considered the first and greatest sefirah, also called "Greatness", the wish to reveal and share. The names of the sefirot come from Kabbalah, and describe the Divine effect that each has upon Creation, but not their inner qualities. Hasidic thought uses new descriptive terms for the inner dimensions of the sefirot:

The four worlds
These ten levels are associated with Kabbalah's four different "Worlds" or planes of existence, the main part from the perspective of the descending "chain of progression" (Seder hishtalshelut), that links the infinite divine Ein Sof with the finite, physical realm. In all Worlds, the 10 sefirot radiate, and are the divine channels through which every level is continuously created from nothing. Since they are the attributes through which the unknowable, infinite divine essence becomes revealed to the creations, all ten emanate in each World. Nonetheless, the structure of the Four Worlds arises because in each one, certain sefirot predominate. Each World is spiritual, apart from the lower aspect of the final World, which is the Asiyah Gashmi ("Physical Asiyah"), the physical Universe. Each World is progressively grosser and further removed from consciousness of the Divine, until in this World it is possible to be unaware of or to deny God. In descending order:

World of Emanation (Atzilut): In this level the light of the Ein Sof radiates and is united with its source. Divine Chochmah, the limitless flash of wisdom beyond grasp, predominates.
World of Creation (Beri'ah): In this level, is the first creation ex nihilo, where the souls and angels have self-awareness, but without form. Divine Binah, the intellectual understanding, predominates.
World of Formation (Yetzirah): On this level, creation is related to form. The Divine emotional sefirot of Chesed to Yesod predominate.
World of Action (Assiah): On this level creation is relegated to its physical aspect, the only physical realm and the lowest World, this realm with all its creatures. The Divine Kingship of Malchut predominates, the purpose of Creation.

In the Zohar and elsewhere, there are these four Worlds or planes of existence. In the Lurianic system of Kabbalah, five Worlds are counted, comprising these and a higher, fifth plane, Adam Kadmon-manifest Godhead level, that mediates between the Ein Sof and the four lower Worlds.

As the four Worlds link the Infinite with this realm, they also enable the soul to ascend in devotion or mystical states, towards the Divine. Each World can be understood as descriptive of dimensional levels of intentionality related to the natural human "desire to receive", and a method for the soul's progress upward toward unity with or return to the Creator. (The terminology of this formulation is based on the exposition of Lurianic Kabbalah by the 20th century Kabbalist Yehuda Ashlag).

In popular culture
 In the seventh episode of first season of the animated series The Midnight Gospel there is a Sefira inside the bag of the main character.
 In the Orion's Arm Universe Project, the godlike artificial intelligences that rule humanity each identify with one of the sefirot.
 In the Japanese anime Neon Genesis Evangelion, the Tree is shown in the opening of the show, along with other religious iconography.
The nine mass-production EVAs and EVA Unit 01 form a sefirot shape in the film The End of Evangelion.
 In the Japanese manga and anime Fullmetal Alchemist, the tree is shown, as depicted by Robert Fludd, on the door to the Gate of Truth.
 In the Japanese novel, manga and anime A Certain Magical Index, the tree is shown and referenced.
 In the Japanese manga and anime 666 Satan (by Seishi Kishimoto, brother to Naruto author Masashi Kishimoto), the Sephirot, its associated angels, along with the Qelipot & its associated demons/devils, are featured as major plot devices & characters.
 Yu-Gi-Oh! 5Ds: Z-ONE, the main antagonist of the final story arc in the anime, is using a set of 11 cards called "Timelords", where the first 10 represents the Sefirot and each named after an archangel in Judaism, and the final card (and the strongest), Sephylon, represents the tree of Sefirot itself, where all Sefirot become one (Daat).
The support cards are also named in Japanese "Nonexistence Machine - Ain", "Endless Machine - Ain Soph", and "Infinite Light - Ain Soph Ohr", named after the concept of "Ein Sof".
 In the Korean video game Lobotomy Corporation, the artificial intelligences that preside over each department of the company are named after the sefirot and are called , and the departments themselves are arranged in an inverse tree.
 In the sequel Library of Ruina, the Sephirah become librarians that manage each floor, now arranged in the correct orientation. 
 Sephiroth is the name of the main antagonist of Final Fantasy VII. His role in the game's narrative is inspired by the tree.
 In the first video game of The Witcher series the protagonist is sent out to search for 10 'sephirot'. These named stones each represent an attribute, listed by the game as "Keth'aar — Crown, Chocc'mah — Wisdom, Veen'ah — Understanding, Kezath — Love, Ghe'vrath — Power, Tipperath — Compassion, Neh'tza — Victory, 'Oth — Glory, Yesath — Foundation and Maal'kad — Kingdom"

See also
 Major Arcana
 Qliphoth
 The path of the flaming sword

References

Further reading
Early texts:
The Sefer Yetzirah the book of creation: In theory and practice, translated and explained by Aryeh Kaplan (1997). Samuel Weiser, Inc.
The Bahir, translated by Aryeh Kaplan (1995). Aronson.
Modern guides:
The Mystical Qabalah, Dion Fortune (Originally published: London, Williams & Norgate 1935; Revised edition published in 2000 by Red Wheel/Weiser, LLC)
Qabalistic Concepts: Living the Tree, William G Gray (1997). Samuel Weiser, Inc.
The Secret Teaching of All Ages by Manly P. Hall (October 27, 2003). Tarcher.
The Decad of Creation by Aaron Leitch (Journal of the Western Mystery Tradition, http://www.jwmt.org/v2n13/doc.html)
Academic study:
Mystical Concepts in Chassidism: An Introduction to Kabbalistic Concepts and Doctrines, Jacob Immanuel Schochet (3rd edition 1998). Kehot.
On The Kabbalah and its Symbolism, Gershom Scholem (1996). Schocken.

External links

The Ten Sefirot: Introduction

Diagram of 10 Sefirot and Attributes
Sefirotic Systems in the Sefer Yetsira, Bahir and Post-Zohar Kabbalah

 
Concepts in metaphysics
Jewish mysticism
Kabbalistic words and phrases
Metaphysical theories
Mysticism
Religious philosophical concepts
Trees in mythology
Religious diagrams